Natural cytotoxicity triggering receptor 2 is a protein that in humans is encoded by the NCR2 gene. NCR2 has also been designated as CD336 (cluster of differentiation 336), NKp44, NKP44; NK-p44, LY95, and dJ149M18.1.

References

Further reading

External links
 
 PDBe-KB provides an overview of all the structure information available in the PDB for Human Natural cytotoxicity triggering receptor 2 (NCR2)

Clusters of differentiation
Human proteins